The Anthology is a unique Sammy Hagar compilation album, in that it combines tracks from both of his Capitol Records and Geffen Records eras. Additionally, four tracks from his two Montrose albums on Warner Bros. Records are included.

Track listing
"Bad Motor Scooter" (Sammy Hagar) - 3:46
"Rock The Nation" (Ronnie Montrose) - 3:04
"Connection" (Mick Jagger/Keith Richards) - 5:44
"Paper Money" (Hagar/Montrose) - 4:58
"Flamingos Fly" (Van Morrison) - 4:23
"Keep On Rockin'" (John Carter/Hagar) - 2:51
"Cruisin' & Boozin'" (Hagar) - 3:07
"Fillmore Shuffle" (Bruce Stephens) - 3:42
"Red" (Carter/Hagar) - 4:06
"You Make Me Crazy" (Hagar) - 2:45
"I've Done Everything for You" (Hagar) - 3:04
"This Planet's on Fire (Burn in Hell)" (Hagar) - 4:37
"Heartbeat" (Betsy Hagar/Hagar) - 3:54
"Piece of My Heart" (Bert Berns/Jerry Ragovoy) - 3:55
"Your Love Is Driving Me Crazy" (Hagar) - 3:23
"Two Sides Of Love" (Hagar) - 3:40
"I Can't Drive 55" (Hagar) - 4:12

External links
 www.redrockerdiscography.com

Sammy Hagar albums
1994 compilation albums